Field Marshal Archibald Percival Wavell, 1st Earl Wavell,  (5 May 1883 – 24 May 1950) was a senior officer of the British Army. He served in the Second Boer War, the Bazar Valley Campaign and the First World War, during which he was wounded in the Second Battle of Ypres. In the Second World War, he served initially as Commander-in-Chief Middle East, in which role he led British forces to victory over the Italians in western Egypt and eastern Libya during Operation Compass in December 1940, only to be defeated by the German Army in the Western Desert in April 1941. He served as Commander-in-Chief, India, from July 1941 until June 1943 (apart from a brief tour as Commander of ABDACOM) and then served as Viceroy of India until his retirement in February 1947.

Early life
Born the son of Archibald Graham Wavell (who later became a major-general in the British Army and military commander of Johannesburg after its capture during the Second Boer War) and Lillie Wavell (née Percival), Wavell attended Eaton House, followed by the leading preparatory boarding school Summer Fields near Oxford, Winchester College, where he was a scholar, and the Royal Military College, Sandhurst. His headmaster, Dr. Fearon, had advised his father that there was no need to send him into the Army as he had "sufficient ability to make his way in other walks of life".

Early career
After graduating from Sandhurst, Wavell was commissioned into the British Army on 8 May 1901 as a second lieutenant in the Black Watch, and joined the 2nd battalion of his regiment in South Africa to fight in the Second Boer War. The battalion stayed in South Africa throughout the war, which formally ended in June 1902 after the Peace of Vereeniging. Wavell was ill, and did not immediately join the battalion as it transferred to British India in October that year; he instead left Cape Town for England on the SS Simla at the same time. In 1903 he was transferred to join the battalion in India and, having been promoted to lieutenant on 13 August 1904, he fought in the Bazar Valley Campaign of February 1908. In January 1909 was seconded from his regiment to be a student at the Staff College. He was one of only two in his class to graduate with an A grade. In 1911, he spent a year as a military observer with the Russian Army to learn Russian, returning to his regiment in December of that year. In April 1912 he became a General Staff Officer Grade 3 (GSO3) in the Russian Section of the War Office. In July, he was granted the temporary rank of captain and became GSO3 at the Directorate of Military Training. On 20 March 1913 Wavell was promoted to the substantive rank of captain. After visiting manoeuvres at Kiev in summer 1913, he was arrested at the Russo-Polish border as a suspected spy, following a search of his Moscow hotel room by the secret police, but managed to remove from his papers an incriminating document listing the information wanted by the War Office.

Wavell was working at the War Office during the Curragh incident. His letters to his father record his disgust at the government's behaviour in giving an ultimatum to officers – he had little doubt that the government had been planning to crush the Ulster Scots, whatever they later claimed. However, he was also concerned at the Army's effectively intervening in politics, not least as there would be an even greater appearance of bias when the Army was used against industrial unrest.

First World War
Wavell was working as a staff officer when the First World War began. As a captain, he was sent to France to a posting at General HQ of the British Expeditionary Force as General Staff Officer Grade 2 (GSO2), but shortly afterwards, in November 1914, was appointed brigade major of 9th Infantry Brigade. He was wounded in the Second Battle of Ypres of 1915, losing his left eye and winning the Military Cross. In October 1915 he became a GSO2 in the 64th Highland Division.

In December 1915, after he had recovered, Wavell was returned to General HQ in France as a GSO2. He was promoted to the substantive rank of major on 8 May 1916. In October 1916 Wavell was graded General Staff Officer Grade 1 (GSO1) as an acting lieutenant-colonel, and was then assigned as a liaison officer to the Russian Army in the Caucasus. In June 1917, he was promoted to brevet lieutenant-colonel and continued to work as a staff officer (GSO1), as liaison officer with the Egyptian Expeditionary Force headquarters.

In January 1918 Wavell received a further staff appointment as Assistant Adjutant & Quartermaster General (AA&QMG) working at the Supreme War Council in Versailles. In March 1918 Wavell was made a temporary brigadier general and returned to Palestine where he served as the brigadier general of the General Staff (BGGS) with XX Corps, part of the Egyptian Expeditionary Force.

Between the world wars
Wavell was given a number of assignments between the wars, though like many officers he had to accept a reduction in rank. In May 1920 he relinquished the temporary rank of Brigadier-General, reverting to lieutenant-colonel. In December 1921, he became an Assistant Adjutant General (AAG) at the War Office and, having been promoted to full colonel on 3 June 1921, he became a GSO1 in the Directorate of Military Operations in July 1923.

Apart from a short period unemployed on half pay in 1926, Wavell continued to hold GSO1 appointments, latterly in the 3rd Infantry Division, until July 1930 when he was once again granted the rank of temporary brigadier and was given command of 6th Infantry Brigade. In March 1932, he was appointed ADC to the King, a position he held until October 1933 when he was promoted to Major-General. However, there was a shortage of jobs for Major-Generals at this time and in January 1934, on relinquishing command of his brigade, he found himself unemployed on half pay once again.

By the end of the year, although still on half pay, Wavell had been designated to command 2nd Division and appointed a CB. In March 1935, he took command of his division. In August 1937 he was transferred to Palestine, where there was growing unrest, to be General Officer Commanding (GOC) British Forces in Palestine and Trans-Jordan and was promoted to Lieutenant-General on 21 January 1938.

In April 1938 Wavell became General Officer Commanding-in-Chief (GOC-in-C) Southern Command in the UK. In July 1939, he was named as General Officer Commanding-in-Chief of Middle East Command with the local rank of full General. Subsequently, on 15 February 1940, to reflect the broadening of his oversight responsibilities to include East Africa, Greece and the Balkans, his title was changed to Commander-in-Chief Middle East.

Second World War military commands

Middle East Command
The Middle Eastern theatre was quiet for the first few months of the war until Italy's declaration of war in June 1940. The Italian forces in North and East Africa greatly outnumbered the British and Wavell's policy was therefore one of "flexible containment" to buy time to build up adequate forces to take the offensive. Having fallen back in front of Italian advances from Libya, Eritrea and Ethiopia, Wavell mounted successful offensives into Libya (Operation Compass) in December 1940 and Eritrea and Ethiopia in January 1941. By February 1941, his Western Desert Force under Lieutenant-General Richard O'Connor had defeated the Italian Tenth Army at Beda Fomm taking 130,000 prisoners and appeared to be on the verge of overrunning the last Italian forces in Libya, which would have ended all direct Axis control in North Africa. His troops in East Africa also had the Italians under pressure and at the end of March his forces in Eritrea under William Platt won the decisive battle of the campaign at Keren which led to the occupation of the Italian colonies in Ethiopia and Somaliland.

 However, in February Wavell had been ordered to halt his advance into Libya and send troops to Greece where the Germans and Italians were attacking. He disagreed with this decision but followed his orders. The result was a disaster. The Germans were given the opportunity to reinforce the Italians in North Africa with the Afrika Korps and by the end of April the weakened Western Desert Force had been pushed all the way back to the Egyptian border, leaving Tobruk under siege. In Greece General Wilson's Force W was unable to set up an adequate defence on the Greek mainland and were forced to withdraw to Crete, suffering 15,000 casualties and leaving behind all their heavy equipment and artillery. Crete was attacked by German airborne forces on 20 May and as in Greece, the British and Commonwealth troops were forced once more to evacuate.

Events in Greece provoked a pro-Axis faction to take over the government of Iraq. Wavell, hard pressed on his other fronts, was unwilling to divert precious resources to Iraq and so it fell to Claude Auchinleck's India Command to send troops to Basra. Winston Churchill, the British Prime Minister, saw Iraq as vital to Britain's strategic interests and in early May, under heavy pressure from London, Wavell agreed to send a division-sized force across the desert from Palestine to relieve the besieged British air base at Habbaniya and to assume overall control of troops in Iraq. By the end of May Quinan's forces in Iraq had captured Baghdad and the Anglo-Iraqi War had ended with troops in Iraq once more reverting to the overall control of GHQ in Delhi. However, Churchill had been unimpressed by Wavell's reluctance to act.

In early June Wavell sent a force under General Wilson to invade Syria and Lebanon, responding to the help given by the Vichy France authorities there to the Iraq Government during the Anglo-Iraqi War. Initial hopes of a quick victory faded as the French put up a determined defence. Churchill determined to relieve Wavell and after the failure in mid June of Operation Battleaxe, intended to relieve Tobruk, he told Wavell on 20 June that he was to be replaced by Auchinleck, whose attitude during the Iraq crisis had impressed him. Rommel rated Wavell highly, despite Wavell's lack of success against him.

Of Wavell, Auchinleck wrote:  "In no sense do I wish to infer that I found an unsatisfactory situation on my arrival – far from it. Not only was I greatly impressed by the solid foundations laid by my predecessor, but I was also able the better to appreciate the vastness of the problems with which he had been confronted and the greatness of his achievements, in a command in which some 40 different languages are spoken by the British and Allied Forces."

India Command

Wavell in effect swapped jobs with Auchinleck, transferring to India where he became Commander-in-Chief, India and a member of the Governor General's Executive Council. Initially his command covered India and Iraq so that within a month of taking charge he launched Iraqforce to invade Persia in co-operation with the Russians in order to secure the oilfields and the lines of communication to the Soviet Union.

Wavell once again had the misfortune of being placed in charge of an undermanned theatre which became a war zone when the Japanese declared war on the United Kingdom in December 1941. He was made Commander-in-Chief of ABDACOM (American-British-Dutch-Australian Command).

Late at night on 10 February 1942, Wavell prepared to board a flying boat, to fly from Singapore to Java. He stepped out of a staff car, not noticing (because of his blind left eye) that it was parked at the edge of a pier. He broke two bones in his back when he fell, and this injury affected his temperament for some time.

On 23 February 1942, with Malaya lost and the Allied position in Java and Sumatra precarious, ABDACOM was closed down and its headquarters in Java evacuated. Wavell returned to India to resume his position as C-in-C India where his responsibilities now included the defence of Burma.

On 23 February British forces in Burma had suffered a serious setback when Major-General Jackie Smyth's decision to destroy the bridge over the Sittang river to prevent the enemy crossing had resulted in most of his division being trapped on the wrong side of the river. The Viceroy Lord Linlithgow sent a signal criticising the conduct of the field commanders to Churchill who forwarded it to Wavell together with an offer to send Harold Alexander, who had commanded the rearguard at Dunkirk. Alexander took command of Allied land forces in Burma in early March with William Slim arriving shortly afterwards from commanding a division in Iraq to take command of its principal formation, Burma Corps. Nevertheless, the pressure from the Japanese Armies was unstoppable and a withdrawal to India was ordered which was completed by the end of May before the start of the monsoon season which brought Japanese progress to a halt.

In order to wrest some of the initiative from the Japanese, Wavell ordered the Eastern Army in India to mount an offensive in the Arakan, which commenced in September. After some initial success the Japanese counter-attacked, and by March 1943 the position was untenable, and the remnants of the attacking force were withdrawn. Wavell relieved the Eastern Army commander, Noel Irwin, of his command and replaced him with George Giffard.

In January 1943, Wavell was promoted to field marshal and on 22 April he returned to London. On 4 May he had an audience with the King, before departing with Churchill for America, returning on 27 May. He resided with Henry 'Chips' Channon MP in Belgrave Square and was reintroduced by him into London society. Churchill nursed "an uncontrollable and unfortunate disapproval – indeed jealous dislike – of Wavell" and had several spats with him in America.

Viceroy of India
On 15 June, Churchill invited Wavell to dinner and offered him the Viceroyalty of India in succession to Linlithgow. Lady Wavell joined him in London on 14 July, when they took up a suite at the Dorchester. Shortly afterwards it was announced that he had been created a viscount (taking the style Viscount Wavell of Cyrenaica and of Winchester, in the county of Southampton) He addressed an all-party meeting at the House of Commons on 27 July, and on 28 July took his seat in the House of Lords as "the Empire's hero". In September, he was formally named Governor-General and Viceroy of India.

One of Wavell's first actions in office was to address the Bengal famine of 1943 by ordering the army to distribute relief supplies to the starving rural Bengalis. He attempted with mixed success to increase the supplies of rice to reduce the prices. During his reign, Gandhi was leading the Quit India campaign, Mohammad Ali Jinnah was working for an independent state for the Muslims and Subhas Chandra Bose befriended Japan "and were pressing forward along India's Eastern border".

Although Wavell was initially popular with Indian politicians, pressure mounted concerning the likely structure and timing of an independent India. He attempted to move the debate along, with the Wavell Plan and the Simla Conference, but received little support from Churchill (who was against Indian independence), nor from Clement Attlee, Churchill's successor as prime minister. He was also hampered by the differences between the various Indian political factions. At the end of the war, rising Indian expectations continued to be unfulfilled, and inter-communal violence increased. Eventually, in 1947, Attlee lost confidence in Wavell and replaced him with Lord Mountbatten of Burma.

Later life

In 1947 Wavell returned to England and was made High Steward of Colchester. The same year, he was created Earl Wavell and given the additional title of Viscount Keren of Eritrea and Winchester.

Wavell was a great lover of literature, and while Viceroy of India he compiled and annotated an anthology of great poetry, Other Men's Flowers, which was published in 1944. He wrote the last poem in the anthology himself and described it as a "...little wayside dandelion of my own". He had a great memory for poetry and often quoted it at length. He is depicted in Evelyn Waugh's novel Officers and Gentlemen, part of the Sword of Honour trilogy, reciting a translation of Callimachus' poetry in public. He was also a member of the Church of England and a deeply religious man.

Wavell died on 24 May 1950 after a relapse following abdominal surgery on 5 May. After his death, his body lay in state at the Tower of London where he had been Constable. A military funeral was held on 7 June 1950 with the funeral procession travelling along the Thames from the Tower to Westminster Pier and then to Westminster Abbey for the funeral service. This was the first military funeral by river since that of Horatio Nelson, 1st Viscount Nelson, in 1806. The funeral was attended by the then Prime Minister Clement Attlee as well as Lord Halifax and fellow officers including Field Marshals Alanbrooke and Montgomery. Winston Churchill did not attend the service.

Wavell is buried in the old mediaeval cloister at Winchester College, next to the Chantry Chapel. His tombstone simply bears the inscription "Wavell". A plaque was placed in the north nave aisle of Winchester Cathedral to commemorate both Wavell and his son. St Andrew's Garrison Church, Aldershot, an Army church, contains a large wooden plaque dedicated to Lord Wavell.

Family
Wavell married Eugenie Marie Quirk, only daughter of Col. J. O. Quirk CB DSO, on 22 April 1915. She survived him and died, as Dowager Countess Wavell, on 11 October 1987, aged 100 years.

Children:
 Archibald John Arthur Wavell, later 2nd Earl Wavell, b. 11 May 1916; d. 24 December 1953, killed in Kenya, in an action against Mau Mau rebels. Since he was unmarried and without issue, the titles became extinct on his death.
 Eugenie Pamela Wavell, b. 2 December 1918, married 14 March 1942 Lt.-Col. A. F. W. Humphrys MBE.
 Felicity Ann Wavell, b. 21 July 1921, married at the Cathedral Church of the Redemption, New Delhi, 20 February 1947 Capt. P. M. Longmore MC, son of Air Chief Marshal Sir Arthur Longmore.
 Joan Patricia Quirk Wavell, b. 23 April 1923, married
 (1) 27 January 1943 Maj. Hon. Simon Nevill Astley (b. 13 August 1919; d. 16 March 1946), 2nd son of Albert Edward Delaval [Astley], 21st Baron Hastings, by his wife Lady Margueritte Helen Nevill, only child by his second wife of Henry Gilbert Ralph [Nevill], 3rd Marquess of Abergavenny.
 (2) 19 June 1948 Maj. Harry Alexander Gordon MC (d. 19 June 1965), 2nd son of Cdr. Alastair Gordon DSO RN.
 (3) Maj. Donald Struan Robertson (d. 1991), son of the Rt. Hon. Sir Malcolm Arnold Robertson GCMG KBE.

Honours and awards

Ribbon bar (as it would look today)

British
 Military Cross – 3 June 1915
 Mention in Despatches 22 June 1915, 4 January 1917, 22 January 1919
 Companion of the Order of St Michael and St George (CMG) – 1 January 1919
 Knight Grand Cross of the Order of the Bath (GCB) – 4 March 1941 (KCB: 2 January 1939; CB: 1 January 1935)
 Knight Grand Commander of the Order of the Star of India (GCSI) – 18 September 1943
 Knight Grand Commander of the Order of the Indian Empire (GCIE) – 18 September 1943
 Knight of the Order of St. John – 4 January 1944

Others
 Order of St Stanislaus, 3rd class with Swords (Russia) (12 September 1916)
 Order of St. Vladimir (Russia) 1917
 Croix de Guerre (Commandeur) (France) – 4 May 1920
 Commandeur, Légion d'honneur (France) – 7 May 1920
 Order of El Nahda, 2nd Class (Hejaz) – 30 September 1920
 Grand Cross, Order of George I with Swords (Greece) – 9 May 1941
 Virtuti Militari, 5th Class (Poland) – 23 September 1941
 War Cross, 1st Class (Greece) – 10 April 1942
 Commander, Order of the Seal of Solomon (Ethiopia) – 5 May 1942
 Grand Cross, Order of Orange-Nassau (Netherlands) – 15 January 1943
 War Cross (Czechoslovakia) – 23 July 1943
 Legion of Merit degree of Chief Commander (United States) – 23 July 1948

Quotes
 "I think he (Benito Mussolini) must do something, if he cannot make a graceful dive he will at least have to jump in somehow; he can hardly put on his dressing-gown and walk down the stairs again."
 "After the 'war to end war', they seem to have been pretty successful in Paris at making the 'Peace to end Peace. (commenting on the treaties ending the First World War; this quotation was the basis for the title of David Fromkin's A Peace to End All Peace, New York: Henry Holt, (1989) )
 "Let us be clear about three facts: First, all battles and all wars are won in the end by the infantryman. Secondly, the infantryman always bears the brunt. His casualties are heavier, he suffers greater extremes of discomfort and fatigue than the other arms. Thirdly, the art of the infantryman is less stereotyped and far harder to acquire in modern war than that of any other arm."

Publications

Books
 
 
 
 
 
 
 
 ; "this first paperback edition contains not only Lord Wavell's own introduction and annotations, but also the introduction written by his son, to whom the book was originally dedicated".

Contributions to periodicals
 Official Middle East Despatches December 1940 to February 1941 published in 
 Official Middle East Despatches February 1941 to July 1941 published in 
 Official Iran, Iraq and Syria Despatches April 1941 to January 1942 published in 
 Official India Despatches March 1942 to December 1942 published in

See also

 The Wavell School

Citations

General sources 
 
  
 
 Chips, the Diaries of Sir Henry Channon, ed. R. Rhodes James, Weidenfeld and Nicolson, London, 1987 - especially Ch. 8.
 
 
 
 Fort, Adrian. Archibald Wavell: The Life and Death of the Imperial Servant (2009)

External links

British Army Officers 1939−1945
Generals of World War II

|-

|-

|-

|-

Viceroys of India
1940s in British India
World War II political leaders
1883 births
1950 deaths
People from Colchester
Chancellors of the University of Aberdeen
British Army personnel of the Second Boer War
British Commanders-in-Chief of India
British field marshals of World War II
English Anglicans
Lord-Lieutenants of the County of London
Recipients of the Military Cross
Chief Commanders of the Legion of Merit
Grand Crosses of the Order of George I with Swords
Recipients of the Order of the Star of Nepal
Knights Grand Cross of the Order of Orange-Nassau
Recipients of the Czechoslovak War Cross
Recipients of the War Cross (Greece)
Recipients of the Silver Cross of the Virtuti Militari
Commandeurs of the Légion d'honneur
Recipients of the Order of Saint Stanislaus (Russian), 3rd class
Recipients of the Order of St. Vladimir
Knights of the Order of St John
Members of the Privy Council of the United Kingdom
People educated at Summer Fields School
People educated at Winchester College
Graduates of the Royal Military College, Sandhurst
Graduates of the Staff College, Camberley
Anthologists
British military personnel of the 1936–1939 Arab revolt in Palestine
Burials in Hampshire
Military history of Malaya during World War II
British people with disabilities
Constables of the Tower of London
Viscounts created by George VI
Earls created by George VI
Military personnel from Colchester
British Army generals of World War I
Members of the Council of the Governor General of India
Pakistan Command and Staff College alumni
Recipients of orders, decorations, and medals of Ethiopia